Devadhanam is the name of two villages in Tamil Nadu, India.
Devadhanam, Thiruvallur district
Devadhanam, Tiruchirappalli district